Far East University may refer to:

 Far East University (Korea)
 Far East University (Taiwan), a university in Tainan, Taiwan
 Former name of Chinese Culture University in 1962–1963, a university in Taipei, Taiwan
 Communist University of the Toilers of the East, also known as the Far East University

See also
 Far Eastern University, the Philippines
 Far Eastern Federal University, Vladivostok, Russia